The Hedda Award (Heddaprisen) is a Norwegian theatre award, first presented in 1998. It is named after the character "Hedda" from Ibsen's play Hedda Gabler. Among its categories, which have varied over the years, are: Best Theatre Production, Best Direction, Best Stage Performance, and occasionally an honorary prize. 
The prize is administered by the Association of Norwegian Theatres and Orchestras (Norsk teater- og orkesterforening) in collaboration with the Norwegian Theater Leaders' Forum (Norsk teaterlederforum). 

Recipients of the Honorary Prize have included Wenche Foss (in 2002), Jon Fosse (2003), and Toralv Maurstad and Espen Skjønberg (both in 2005). Else Nordvang in 2008, Edith Roger in 2010 and Bjørn Sundquist in 2017.

Awards

References

External links 
  

Awards established in 1998
Norwegian theatre awards